State Route 13 (SR 13) is a  state highway in the north-central part of the U.S. state of Georgia, that travels through portions of Fulton, DeKalb, Gwinnett, and Hall counties.

It begins at West Peachtree Street and Spring Street (US 19/SR 9) just to the north of 17th Street in the northern part of Midtown Atlanta. The section south of Buckhead is a full freeway, from its southern terminus to Sidney Marcus Boulevard, built in 1953 as an extension of the Downtown Connector (built in 1952). This was later the original alignment of Interstate 85 (I-85; Northeast Expressway) through northeast Atlanta until 1985, when it was replaced by several lanes in each direction on a new roadway and viaduct immediately adjacent to it during the Freeing the Freeways construction boom.

SR 13 ends at Jesse Jewell Parkway (SR 369) in Gainesville. The name changes from Buford Highway to Atlanta Highway at the northeast city limits of Buford.

SR 13 once continued northeast past Gainesville, roughly along present SR 365, to the South Carolina state line on US 123.

Route description

Buford–Spring Connector
SR 13 begins at an interchange with US 19/SR 9, which are aligned onto two one-way streets: Spring Street NW southbound and Peachtree Street NE northbound. The highway starts heading west but curves around to the northeast along a section of freeway adjacent to I-85. A half-interchange provides a shortcut for southbound traffic to Peachtree Street and from Peachtree Street to SR 13 north. The connector itself avoids having exits with surface roads (Monroe Drive, Piedmont Road, and Sidney Marcus Boulevard) on the newer I-85 routing, aside from slip ramps between the old and new freeways.

The portion of SR 13, from I-85 in the northwestern part of Atlanta to the I-285 interchange in Doraville, is part of the National Highway System, a system of routes determined to be the most important for the nation's economy, mobility, and defense.

Buford Highway

In the Atlanta metropolitan area, Buford Highway is a linear community made up of multiracial suburban neighborhoods and shopping centers. Similar to other Sun Belt cities, immigrants who relocated to Atlanta in the 20th and 21st centuries went straight to the suburbs, where residential and commercial real estate was affordable and where many second-generation immigrant communities were already established. Along Buford Highway, there are few wholly distinct ethnic areas. The more than 1,000 immigrant-owned businesses are owned by, and patronized by, a wide variety of ethnic groups, notably Korean, Mexican, Chinese, and Vietnamese, and also Indian/South Asian, Central American, Somalis, and Ethiopian. The DeKalb County Chamber of Commerce calls the area the "International Corridor."

The Buford Highway community is home to one of the highest concentration of foreign-born residents in the country, notably Mexican, Central American, Chinese, Korean, and Vietnamese. The area attracted many Latino workers during the construction boom that preceded the 1996 Summer Olympics. Asian business owners were attracted to the stretch of highway by cheap leases and reliable traffic flow.

Buford Highway is, in most places in the corridor, a seven-lane highway with no median and few sidewalks, a situation which is grossly mismatched with the heavy pedestrian traffic along and across the highway. During the mid-2010s, raised medians have replaced most of the center turn lane (which at one time was a reversible lane), and new crosswalks have been added between intersections.

Most properties along the corridor are in the form of strip malls, retail businesses surrounded by large parking lots, and large apartment complexes. The largest strip malls are the  Northeast Plaza,  Plaza Fiesta and the Buford Highway Farmers Market complex.

Northeast of Atlanta, Buford Highway is an international community spanning multiple counties including Fulton, Dekalb, and Gwinnett. The area generally spans along, and on either side of, a stretch of SR 13 in DeKalb County.

Atlanta Highway

Extending north of Buford, the name changes from "Buford Highway" to "Atlanta Highway" and continues to SR 369 in Gainesville.

History

1920s
SR 13 was established at least as early as 1919 from Lawrenceville north-northwest to Buford, northeast to Gainesville and Cornelia, and east-northeast to Toccoa. By the end of September 1921, it was extended south-southeast from Lawrenceville to SR 45 in Loganville. It was also extended east-northeast from Toccoa to the South Carolina state line. By October 1926, US 270 was designated on the Lawrenceville–Gainesville segment. A portion of the highway in the south-southwest part of Gainesville had a "completed hard surface". By October 1929, US 270 was decommissioned, with US 19 being designated on the Lawrenceville–Gainesville segment instead. Three segments of SR 13 had a completed hard surface: from south-southeast of Buford to Gainesville, from southwest of Baldwin to Cornelia, and the Stephens County portion of the Cornelia–Toccoa segment.

1930s
By the middle of 1930, the portion from Lawrenceville to the northeastern part of Gainesville was completed. Between November 1930 and the beginning of 1932, US 19 was shifted off of SR 13, with US 23 designated on the Lawrenceville–Cornelia segment. Two segments had a completed hard surface: the Gainesville–Baldwin and Cornelia–South Carolina segments. In January 1932, SR 13 was designated from US 19/SR 9 in Buckhead to Buford. The Loganville–Buford segment was redesignated as part of SR 20. Between November 1932 and May 1933, the southern part of the Buckhead–Buford segment had a completed hard surface. In the second quarter of 1935, a portion southwest of Buford was completed. Two years later, the entire Buckhead–Buford segment was completed. At the end of the year, the southern terminus of SR 13 was indicated to be at US 23/US 29/US 78/SR 8/SR 10/SR 12 (Ponce de Leon Avenue) in the southern part of Midtown Atlanta. SR 13 traveled on Piedmont Avenue to the north-northeast and resumed its previous path. Between September 1938 and July 1939, US 23 was shifted onto the path of SR 13 from Atlanta to Buford.

1940s to 1980s
Between November 1946 and February 1948, US 123 was designated on SR 13 from Cornelia to the South Carolina state line. In 1967, US 23 was shifted off of Piedmont Road and Cheshire Bridge Road to the east, onto SR 42. Two years later, US 23 was again shifted off of SR 13, from Sugar Hill to northeast of Gainesville. It was moved to the east, onto the newly constructed SR 365 freeway. A decade later, SR 365 was proposed to be extended from northeast of Gainesville to northwest of Cornelia. This extension was under construction. In 1980, US 23 was shifted off of Buford Highway, between North Druid Hills Road and Clairmont Road, to the east, onto SR 155. SR 365 was designated on US 23/SR 13 from northeast of Gainesville to north-northwest of Alto. US 23/SR 13/SR 365, between Lula and northwest of Cornelia, was shifted westward, onto the previously proposed path of SR 365. The next year, US 23/SR 13/SR 365 from northeast of Gainesville to Lula was also shifted northward onto this path. In 1983, the southern terminus of SR 13 was truncated to the Cheshire Bridge Road interchange with I-85. Two years later, SR 13 was proposed to be extended along its current path to its current southern terminus. In 1986, this extension was built as a freeway. In 1988, SR 365 was proposed to be extended from just south of Demorest to just northeast of Boydville. The next year, SR 13 was shifted westward, onto a former proposed northern extension of SR 365 Bus. northeast of the city. SR 365 was extended east-northeast from south-southeast of Demorest to SR 115 south-southeast of Hollywood. In 1991, the northern terminus of SR 13 was truncated to an interchange with I-985/US 23/SR 365 northeast of Gainesville. In 1997, the northern terminus was further truncated to its current point, with SR 369 extended along the former path in Gainesville.

Buford Highway originated as a non-descript state roadway connecting Atlanta and points northeast, including the then-railroad towns of Chamblee and Doraville, as well as points farther north. The towns of Doraville, Chamblee, and Norcross had long been home to a blue collar, largely white, lower middle-class population. The highway was characterized by strip mall development, and apartment complexes sprouted up in the 1960s and 1970s. In 1976, the first ethnic restaurant opened, the Havana Sandwich Shop. In the 1980s, immigrants settled in the area due to affordable housing, available public transportation, and proximity to construction jobs in growing Gwinnett County. The area attracted many Latino workers during the construction boom that preceded the 1996 Olympic Games. Asian business owners were attracted to the stretch of highway by cheap leases and reliable traffic flow.

During the 1996 Olympics, Chamblee embraced the growing international character of Buford Highway, while more conservative Doraville resisted it. As the Southern Foodways Alliance reported:"'Why would we want to attract more immigrants when we got all we want?' asked Doraville mayor Lamar Lang to the press. 'That’s just not our way of life here,' agreed the city council. 'We’re basically Baptists and Methodists and Presbyterians.'"

Accidents

On July 22, 2010 PBS's Need to Know program portrayed the corridor as an example of a high-pedestrian area in suburban America that fails to meet increased demand for walkability due to changing demographics. The program noted that in the previous ten years, 30 people had died and an additional 250 were injured while trying to cross Buford Highway, a rate three times higher than any other road in Georgia. Despite this, there were no plans to improve pedestrian safety in the unincorporated area of the corridor. Since then, improvements have been made, and the new city of Brookhaven has incorporated from Buford Highway northward.

In 2017, the Interstate 85 bridge collapse temporarily closed the connector at Piedmont Road (SR 237) on the evening of March 30 as High-density polyethylene conduit rolls stored under the newer viaduct burned, spewing black smoke and intense fire toward the southbound lanes. Since the connector is lower than the viaduct and only has a short bridge over the road itself, it was not damaged and was used by the Atlanta Fire Department to fight the massive blaze. The connector partially reopened two days later, its four total lanes being the only parallel route to stand in for the ten or more lanes which are now missing from the new freeway while it is being replaced.

Public transportation
Buford Highway is served by MARTA bus route 39 (Lindbergh Center station to Doraville) as well as privately run "jitneys", or minibuses.<ref>{{cite web |url=http://www.ajc.com/news/opinion/response-recent-conversation/fzEAmsY491a4NEWsHy7T7H/ |title="Response to Recent Conversation", '"Atlanta Journal-Constitution, August 26, 2013 |publisher=Ajc.com |date=August 26, 2013 |access-date=March 31, 2017 }}</ref> Since 1992, the Doraville MARTA metro rail station is also a block away from Buford Highway at the end of the Gold Line. Originally the North and then Northeast Line, MARTA's 2009 change to a color-based system created controversy with the Asian community along the highway when it was to originally have become the Yellow Line.

In popular culture
The city of Chamblee, in which part of the Buford Highway community is located, is sometimes referred to as "Chambodia" due to its high Asian population and the concentration of Asian restaurants along Buford Highway in Chamblee. A chapter of Tom Wolfe's novel A Man in Full'' is titled "Chambodia".

Major intersections

Special routes

Doraville connector route

State Route 13 Connector (SR 13 Conn.) is a  connector route of SR 13 that connects US 23/SR 13 (Buford Highway NE) to SR 141 (Peachtree Industrial Boulevard) in Doraville, within DeKalb County. The entire route travels along Motors Industrial Way, a four-lane divided highway with a grassy median. The highway is separated from the inner lanes of Interstate 285 (I-285) by a Jersey barrier.

SR 13 Conn. is not part of the National Highway System, a system of roadways important to the nation's economy, defense, and mobility.

The roadway that would eventually become SR 13 Conn. was established between February 1948 and April 1949 as part of SR 13W on its current path. In 1971, this portion of SR 13W was redesignated as SR 13 Conn.

Buford spur route

State Route 13 Spur (SR 13 Spur) was a spur route of SR 13 that existed mostly within the city limits of Buford. Between the beginning of 1945 and November 1946, it was established from an intersection with US 23/SR 13 in the southern part of Buford. It traveled to the north-northwest, concurrent with SR 20 for a short distance until they split, with SR 20 heading southwest and SR 13 Spur heading northeast. The spur route curved to the north-northeast and leaves the city limits of Buford. It curves to the east-southeast, with a southeastern bend, until it reaches its northern terminus, another intersection with US 23/SR 13 just southwest of Rest Haven. Between the beginning of 1951 and the beginning of 1965, the spur route was redesignated as SR 13 Loop.

Buford loop route

State Route 13 Loop (SR 13 Loop) was a loop route of SR 13 that existed mostly within the city limits of Buford. The roadway that would eventually become SR 13 Loop was established between the beginning of 1945 and November 1946 as SR 13 Spur, from an intersection with US 23/SR 13 in the southern part of Buford. It traveled to the north-northwest, concurrent with SR 20 for a short distance until they split, with SR 20 heading southwest and SR 13 Spur heading northeast. The spur route curved to the north-northeast and left the city limits of Buford. It curved to the east-southeast, with a southeastern bend, until it reached its northern terminus, another intersection with US 23/SR 13 just southwest of Rest Haven. Between the beginning of 1951 and the beginning of 1965, the spur route was redesignated as SR 13 Loop. Between September 1953 and June 1954, SR 20 was rerouted through the Sugar Hill–Buford area and off of SR 13 Loop. In 1990, the loop route was decommissioned.

Hall County connector route

State Route 13 Connector (SR 13 Conn.) was a connector route of SR 13 that existed in rural parts of Hall County, south of the Gainesville area. In 1970, the connector was established from SR 13 east-northeast of Flowery Branch to SR 53 north-northwest of Chestnut Mountain. In 1980, this highway was decommissioned.

Gainesville connector route

State Route 13 Connector (SR 13 Conn.) was a short-lived connector route of SR 13 that existed completely within the city limits of Gainesville. Between June 1960 and June 1963, it was established from an intersection with US 23/SR 13 (Peachtree Road) in the southern part of the city. It traveled to the north-northeast on Railroad Avenue, paralleling some railroad tracks of Southern Railway. SR 13 Conn. and the railroad tracks curved to the northeast, skirting past the Gainesville Municipal Airport. They crossed over some railroad tracks of Georgia Midland Railroad. At Bradford Street, the connector route turned left and left the railroad tracks. At College Street, it turned right. After an intersection with US 129/SR 11 (Athens Road), it curved to the north and had a second intersection with US 23/SR 13 (Broad Street/East Spring Street). SR 13 Conn. continued as South Enota Avenue and curved to the north-northwest before reaching its northern terminus, a second intersection with US 129/SR 11 (Morningside Drive) in the northern part. In 1969, SR 13 Conn. was redesignated as SR 11 Conn.

Stephens County connector route

State Route 13 Connector (SR 13 Conn.) was a connector route of SR 13 that existed in Stephens County, south of Toccoa. In 1985, it was proposed to be designated from US 123/SR 13/SR 184 just northeast of Boydville to SR 17 east-southeast of Toccoa. The next year, it was actually established on this proposed path. In 1991, the path of SR 17 was shifted southward, replacing SR 13 Conn.

See also

References

External links

 
 Georgia Roads (Routes 1 - 20)

013
Transportation in Fulton County, Georgia
Transportation in DeKalb County, Georgia
Transportation in Gwinnett County, Georgia
Transportation in Hall County, Georgia
Roads in Atlanta
Transportation in Brookhaven, Georgia
Chamblee, Georgia
Doraville, Georgia
Duluth, Georgia
Buford, Georgia
Gainesville, Georgia
Suwanee, Georgia
U.S. Route 23